The United States Medical Licensing Examination score (USMLE score) is given to test takers as a 3-digit score.  This score is commonly used by hospitals to determine eligibility for residency and fellowship.  The three-digit score is based on a theoretical maximum of 300, but this has not been documented by the NBME / FSMB.  Previously, a 2 digit score was also provided, but has since been eliminated.  The two-digit score was normalized to the three-digit score such that a 75 was equal to the minimum passing score (currently 194) for the USMLE Step 1.  Contrary to popular opinion, the two-digit score does not represent a percentile.

Three-digit USMLE score
The NBME / FSMB have never clearly stated that the three-digit score is based on an absolute scale with a maximum of 300.  However, this is the assumption stated by NBME with regard to their Comprehensive Basic Science Self-Assessment (CBSSA).  The minimum passing level for the three-digit score is 194 effective since January 1, 2018  The average score varies by year and tends to be near 230.

Two-digit USMLE score
The two-digit scoring system has been deleted from USMLE Transcripts effective from April, 2013.

USMLE score calculator
There are a number of score calculators and converters available for the USMLE.  A free calculator and converter is available at https://usmle-score-correlation.blogspot.com/ and permits the conversion between the three-digit score and two-digit score.

References

External links
USMLE Estimator

Medical regulation in the United States
Medical education in the United States